Cedar Brook is a tributary of Cranbury Brook in Cranbury, New Jersey, United States.

Course
It flows southwest, crossing Applegarth Road and Prospect Plains Road before crossing the Turnpike. It then crosses Cranbury-South River Road and Route 130 and flows through a swamp area.

Accessibility
This stream is large and accessible by many of the roads it crosses.

See also
List of rivers of New Jersey

References

External links
USGS Coordinates in Google Maps

Tributaries of the Raritan River
Rivers of New Jersey
Rivers of Middlesex County, New Jersey